Anco may refer to:

Places
 Anco, Kentucky, US
 Anco District, Churcampa, Peru
 Anco District, La Mar, Peru

Other
 Anco Jansen (born 1989), Dutch footballer
 AnCO (An Chomhairle Oiliúna), Irish training council, predecessor of FÁS and subsequently SOLAS
 Animal Collective, an American experimental band